The Bayeux (Baion in Occitan) is a short stream in the southeast of France. In the upper  of its course it is called Bayon. It runs from the Montagne Sainte-Victoire to the Arc, near Meyreuil.

References

Rivers of France
Rivers of Bouches-du-Rhône
Rivers of Provence-Alpes-Côte d'Azur